Reginald Evans (born 18 March 1939 in Consett, County Durham) is a former footballer for Newcastle United from 1956 to 1959.

In the mid-fifties great things were expected from Reg; however, he failed to live up to his early potential and moved on after 4 appearances for Newcastle.

1959 saw him move to Charlton Athletic and then onto Ashington.

Evans worked as a brewer for Newcastle Breweries for nearly 40 years until 1996, when he became a tour guide at the brewery.

References

1939 births
Living people
Newcastle United F.C. players
Charlton Athletic F.C. players
Sportspeople from Consett
Footballers from County Durham
Association football midfielders
English footballers